Grand Master a title of the supreme head of various orders, including chivalric orders such as military orders and dynastic orders of knighthood.

The title also occurs in modern civil fraternal orders such as the Freemasons, the Odd Fellows, and various other fraternities. Additionally, numerous modern self-styled orders attempt to imitate habits of the former bodies.

History

Medieval era 

In medieval military orders such as the Knights Templar or the Livonian Brothers of the Sword, the Grand Master was the formal and executive head of a military and feudal hierarchy, which can be considered a "state within the state", especially in the crusader context lato sensu, notably aimed at the Holy Land or pagan territories in Eastern Europe, as well as the reconquista in the Iberian peninsula.

If an order is granted statehood and thus widely considered sovereign, the Grand Master is also its Head of State. If within the Holy Roman Empire, a Reichsfürst and Head of Government, and thus a true territorial Prince of the church, as was the case with the Teutonic Knights and the Sovereign Military Order of Malta.

Modern era 
Except the modern continuation of the organisations of medieval foundation, the title of Grand Master has been used by the heads of Grand Lodges of Freemasons since 1717, and by Odd Fellows since the 18th century.

The title of Grand Master is also used by various other fraternities, including academic ones associated with universities. The national leader of the Kappa Sigma Fraternity goes by the title "Worthy Grand Master". The heads of local chapters use the title of "Grand Master".

Orders of chivalry 
A sovereign monarch often holds the title of Grand Master of the highest honorary dynastic orders of knighthood, or may confer or entrust it upon another person including a prince of the royal family, regularly the heir to the throne, who in other orders may hold another high rank/title.

The term "Sovereign" is generally used in place of "Grand Master" for the supreme head of various orders in Britain and other Commonwealth nations. In the Sovereign Military Order of Malta, the Grand Master is styled "Sovereign", e.g. Sovereign Grand Master, due to its status as an internationally independent sovereign entity.

In republican nations, a president may also serve as the grand master of the various state orders such as in France, where the president is the grand master of the Legion of Honour, and Portugal.

Fraternal orders

Freemasonry 

In Freemasonry, the Grand Master is an office given to a Freemason elected to oversee a Masonic jurisdiction.

See also
List of Grand Masters of the Knights Hospitaller
Grand Magistry and Lieutenancies of the Order of the Holy Sepulchre
Grand Masters of the Knights Templar
Grand Masters of the Order of Saint Lazarus
Grand Masters of the Teutonic Knights
Grand Master (Masonic)

References

Works cited

Further reading

 
Fraternal orders